Aniulus is a genus of millipedes in the family Parajulidae. There are more than 20 described species in Aniulus.

Species
These 26 species belong to the genus Aniulus:

 Aniulus acuminatus Loomis, 1976
 Aniulus adelphus Chamberlin, 1940
 Aniulus annectans (Chamberlin, 1921)
 Aniulus austinensis Chamberlin, 1940
 Aniulus bollmani Causey, 1952
 Aniulus brachygon Shelley, 2000
 Aniulus brazonus Chamberlin, 1940
 Aniulus brevis Shelley, 2000
 Aniulus causeyae Shelley, 2000
 Aniulus craterus Chamberlin, 1940
 Aniulus dorophor Chamberlin, 1940
 Aniulus fili Loomis, 1975
 Aniulus fluviatilis Chamberlin, 1940
 Aniulus garius (Chamberlin, 1912)
 Aniulus hopius Chamberlin, 1941
 Aniulus houstonensis Shelley, 2000
 Aniulus kopius Chamberlin
 Aniulus nigrans (Chamberlin, 1918)
 Aniulus oreines Chamberlin, 1940
 Aniulus orientalis Causey, 1952
 Aniulus orthodoxus Chamberlin, 1946
 Aniulus paiutus (Chamberlin, 1925)
 Aniulus paludicolens Causey, 1967
 Aniulus paludicolus Causey
 Aniulus prosoicus Chamberlin, 1940
 Aniulus vestigialis Loomis, 1959

References

Further reading

 
 

Julida
Articles created by Qbugbot